is a passenger railway station in the city of Midori, Gunma, Japan, operated by the third sector railway company Watarase Keikoku Railway.

Lines

Station layout
The station has a single island platform, of which only one side is used, making it effectively a single side platform station. The station is unattended.

History
Hanawa Station opened on 31 December 1912 as a station on the Ashio Railway.

Surrounding area
 former Azuma Village Hall
 Hanawa Post Office

See also
 List of railway stations in Japan

External links

   Station information (Watarase Keikoku) 

Railway stations in Gunma Prefecture
Railway stations in Japan opened in 1912
Midori, Gunma